Four:twenty Recordings is an independent record label begun in Bristol, England in 2001. Its founder, Luke Allen, explains that Four:twenty's objective is to promote "innovative forward thinking electronic dance music".

Since the label's outset nearly a decade ago, it has released records for many different artists - both those with an already well-established name on the dance music scene and also those straight from the underground. Some producers which have released records with Four:twenty include: Loco Dice, Martin Buttrich, James Mowbray & D Ramirez, Tom Demac and, most recently, Glimpse.

References

External links
 Resident Advisor article
 Official Website
 Discography

English record labels